Samson For President (Martin Bejarano Wahlgren) is an independent Swedish soul man, performer, songwriter and producer.

Early life and education
Martin Bejarano Wahlgren grew up in Stocksund in Stockholm Sweden and attended Stockholms estetiska gymnasium, a gymnasium for the arts.

Career
He has been prominent on the Swedish soul scene since the release of his first demo album Kibiriti in 2007. He made a name for himself in 2012 while still a student with the release of his first studio album, Papa’s Old Piano (the title derived from the 100-year-old piano he shared while growing up with his father, who loved to play classical music), which got him featured on TV4s Nyhetsmorgon and played on P3 and SR Metropol and got him nominated for "Soul Album Af The Year" at the Kingsize Awards. However, the reviewer for Dagens Nyheter found it a very "cautious" recording.

He has also performed on P3s Musikhjälpen and has been cited since 2012 as part of the evidence of a blooming soul renaissance in Sweden; he was featured on P3 Soul with Mats Nileskär as part of this new soul wave. He is a recurring performer at the classic Stockholm venue Fasching, and is also known for turning down a golden ticket for the Swedish version of American Idol.

He has been the opening act for Raphael Saadiq in 2013 and he once performed "100 Days, 100 Nights" alongside Sharon Jones & The Dap-Kings. Throughout his career he has worked with Swedish artists such as Mohammed Ali, Carlito, The Salazar Brothers, Isak Strand, Jonas Asker, Kristin Amparo, Malena Uamba and Soulful. He was the opening act for  when he visited Stockholm and he once .

In 2013 he was one of three recipients of an arts stipend from Haninge Municipality.

Samson For President is currently working on his new EP and second studio album.

Discography
Albums

Kibiriti (2007, Flow Free)]

Papas Old Piano (2012, Flow Free)]

Sisyphus (2015, Flow Free)]

EPs

For Your Love EP (2014, Flow Free)]

Go Big EP (2018, Psykbunkern/Art:ery)]

References

Swedish male musicians
Living people
Year of birth missing (living people)